The year 2012 is the ninth year in the history of the Konfrontacja Sztuk Walki, a mixed martial arts promotion based in Poland. In 2012 Konfrontacja Sztuk Walki held 4 events beginning with, KSW 18: Unfinished Sympathy.

List of events

KSW 18: Unfinished Sympathy

KSW 18: Unfinished Sympathy was a mixed martial arts event  held on February 25, 2012 at the Orlen Arena in Płock, Poland.

Background

The original main event of Jan Błachowicz fighting Dave Branch was changed when Branch had passport issues in the days leading up to the event.  He was replaced by Mario Miranda.  

Marcin Różalski was initially scheduled to face Jerome Le Banner in a non-main event fight. However, a knee injury forced Le Banner off the card and with only two days notice Valentijn Overeem stepped in as a replacement.

Results

KSW 19: Pudzianowski vs. Sapp

KSW 19: Pudzianowski vs. Sapp was a mixed martial arts event held on May 12, 2012 at the Atlas Arena in Łódź, Poland.

Background

The main event featured former World's Strongest Man Mariusz Pudzianowski facing Bob Sapp.

Also on the card was the first ever women's bout in KSW history when Marta Chojnoska fought Paulina Suska in a  catchweight bout.

The vacant KSW Middleweight Championship was given to the winner of  Michał Materla and Jay Silva.

Results

KSW 20: Fighting Symphonies

KSW 20: Fighting Symphonies was a mixed martial arts event held on September 15, 2012 at the Ergo Arena in Gdańsk, Poland.

Background

The event featured Jan Błachowicz defending the Light Heavyweight Championship against Houston Alexander.

The Różalski-Le Banner bout was originally scheduled for KSW 18, however Le Banner was forced to withdraw due to an injured knee. Le Banner was again forced out of this bout due to injury and was replaced by Rodney Glunder.

Results

KSW 21: Ultimate Explanation 

KSW 21: Ultimate Explanation was a mixed martial arts event held on December 1, 2012 at the Hala Torwar in Warsaw, Poland.

Background

It was KSW comeback to Warsaw after two years with no events in capitol city of Poland.

Mamed Khalidov was expected to fight Melvin Manhoef in the main event. However, Manhoef suffered an injury to his left leg and pulled out of the bout. Kendall Grove stepped in to fight Khalidov.

Results

References

2012 in mixed martial arts
Konfrontacja Sztuk Walki events
Konfrontacja Sztuk Walki events